Clyde Cecil Bissett (born 1908, date of death unknown) was a Rhodesian boxer who competed in the 1928 Summer Olympics.
While representing Rhodesia at the Olympics, he defeated Carlos Orellana of Mexico before being eliminated in the quarter-finals of the lightweight class by Carlo Orlandi of Italy.

His life after the Games is unknown. A Cecil Bissett was assistant native commissioner at Miami (modern Mwami) in 1949.

References

External links

1908 births
Year of death missing
Rhodesian male boxers
Lightweight boxers
Olympic boxers of Rhodesia
Boxers at the 1928 Summer Olympics
White Rhodesian people